Frea flavoscapulata is a species of beetle in the family Cerambycidae. It was described by Fairmaire in 1897. It contains the varietas Frea flavoscapulata var. albescens.

References

flavoscapulata
Beetles described in 1897